= Kudoshi =

Village in Maharashtra

- Village
- Interactive map of Kudoshi
- Country: India
- State: Maharashtra

Kudoshi is a small village in Ratnagiri district, Maharashtra state in Western India. The 2011 Census of India recorded a total of 886 residents in the village. Kudoshi's geographical area is 577 hectares (1,430 acres).
